"Point of View (Squeeze a Little Lovin')" is a 1979 song by Matumbi. It made No. 35 on the UK Singles Chart.

References

1979 singles
1979 songs
Matumbi (band) songs
Songs written by Dennis Bovell